Girkin is an unincorporated community in Warren, Kentucky, United States. Its post office closed in 1913.

References

Unincorporated communities in Warren County, Kentucky
Unincorporated communities in Kentucky